Edward Carl Cibrian (born June 16, 1973) is an American actor. He is best known for his roles as Cole Deschanel on the television series Sunset Beach and Jimmy Doherty on Third Watch. 

His other notable television roles include Matt Clark in The Young and the Restless, Russell Varon in Invasion, Jesse Cardoza in CSI: Miami and Eddie Valetik in Take Two. Some of his best known films include the cult classic But I'm a Cheerleader and The Best Man Holiday.

Early life and career
Cibrian, an only child, was born in Burbank, California. His mother, Hortensia (née Balaguer), is an office manager, and his father, Carl Cibrian, a banker. Both of Cibrian's parents are from Cuba. His father's family immigrated from Cuba to the United States after Castro came to power in 1959. His mother's family left Cuba about three years later. Cibrian's parents later met in California.

Cibrian starred in The Young and the Restless as Matt Clark, Baywatch Nights as Griff Walker, Sunset Beach as Cole Deschanel, CSI: Miami as Jesse Cardoza, Third Watch as womanizing New York City firefighter Jimmy Doherty, Tilt as rising poker star Eddie Towne, and Invasion as Everglades park ranger Russell Varon. He also guest-starred in Saved by the Bell: The College Years, Sabrina, the Teenage Witch, Criminal Minds, and Beverly Hills, 90210. His movie credits include Living Out Loud (1998), But I'm a Cheerleader (1999), and The Cave (2005).

In addition to acting, he sang in the soul-pop boy band 3Deep from 1998 to 2001, along with Young and The Restless costar and real-life best friend Joshua Morrow and Canadian singer CJ Huyer.

In 2006, Cibrian joined the cast of the Fox series Vanished midway through the season. The series was canceled after nine of the thirteen episodes produced were aired with subsequent episodes released via Myspace. The following year, he was cast as Jason Austin in the unaired pilot of Football Wives, the ABC remake of the British drama Footballers Wives.

Cibrian has had guest spots on Samantha Who?, Dirty Sexy Money, and Ugly Betty. In 2009, he joined the cast of CSI: Miami as an officer from the Hollywood division who joins Horatio's team in Miami. His contract was not picked up for the 2010–11 season.

In July 2010, Cibrian guest starred as a bounty hunter in multiple episodes of NBC's drama series Chase.

In March 2011, Cibrian was cast as the lead in the NBC pilot for The Playboy Club, a TV series set at the first Playboy Club in Chicago in 1963. In early October 2011, The Playboy Club was canceled by NBC after three episodes due to low ratings. In 2016, he was added to the cast of Rosewood as Capt. Ryan Slade. In 2018, he starred as the Private Investigator, Eddie Valetik, in Take Two on ABC.

Personal life
In May 2001, Cibrian married Brandi Glanville, a former model and reality television star. Cibrian and Glanville have two sons, Mason and Jake. The couple announced their separation in July 2009 when it was revealed Cibrian had an affair with country music singer LeAnn Rimes, after they appeared together in the movie Northern Lights. Cibrian and Glanville's divorce was finalized on September 30, 2010. The circumstances surrounding the affair and divorce were a part of Glanville's book Drinking and Tweeting: And Other Brandi Blunders.  In a 2013 interview, Glanville commented, "Marriages break up all the time. People have affairs. Happens every day. It matters how you handle yourself after and if you're actually remorseful. I've never found LeAnn to be remorseful. I found her to be like, 'Nah-nah-nah-nah-nah, I got your family.'"

On December 27, 2010, it was announced that Cibrian was engaged to Rimes. The couple wed on April 22, 2011, at a private home in California.

Filmography

Film

Television

Award nominations

References

External links

 Eddie Cibrian at VH1

1973 births
Living people
20th-century American male actors
21st-century American male actors
3Deep members
American entertainers of Cuban descent
American male film actors
American male soap opera actors
American male television actors
Hispanic and Latino American male actors
Male actors from Burbank, California
People from Burbank, California
People from Hidden Hills, California